The GQM-163 Coyote is a supersonic sea skimming target built by Northrop Grumman (formerly Orbital ATK) and used by the United States Navy as a successor to the MQM-8 Vandal. Orbital's proposal was chosen over the MA-31, a joint venture between Boeing and Zvezda-Strela. Orbital was awarded their contract for the development of the Coyote SSST in June 2000.  

The Coyote is initially boosted by a Hercules MK-70 booster, of similar design to those used by the now obsolete RIM-67 Standard ER missiles.  After the booster stage is expended the missile switches to an Aerojet MARC-R-282 solid-fuel rocket /ramjet engine for sustaining its flight.

In July 2018, Orbital Sciences Corp was awarded a US$52m modification to its existing contract, for 18 Lot 12 targets plus some Foreign Military Sales.

Operators

 United States of America
 US Navy
 France
 French Navy
 Australia
 Australian Navy
 Japan
 Japan Maritime Self Defense Force

References

Ramjet-powered aircraft
Orbital Sciences Corporation
Target drones of the United States
Target missiles
Military equipment introduced in the 2000s